FK Zeta is a football club from Golubovci, a suburb of Podgorica, the capital of Montenegro. It plays in the Montenegrin Second League. The club was the inaugural champion of the Montenegrin First League in 2006–07 season.

History

Period 1927-1997
The club was formed in 1927 under the name FK Danica. During the first decades, they played only non-league matches. From 194g, the club played under the name FK Napredak, and since 1955, the team is playing under the name FK Zeta.
Until the start of seventies, FK Zeta played at lowest-rank competitions. First significant success, team from Golubovci made at season 1971–72 with promotion to Montenegrin Republic League. In that, third-level competition in SFR Yugoslavia, FK Zeta spent most of their seasons in following two decades, with greatest result as a second-places team at the end of seasons 1974–75, 1975–76, 1982–83 and 1983–84, but without success to gain a promotion to Yugoslav Second League. At season 1982–83, championship derby FK Berane – FK Zeta attended 10,000 spectators, which was a record attendance in Montenegrin Republic League until the 1999 game FK Jezero – FK Gusinje.

Until the middle of nineties, except in Republic League, FK Zeta also played few seasons in Fourth League – Center.

Period 1997-2006
Successful era in FK Zeta history started at season 1997–98. The team won their first champion title in Montenegrin Republic League and secured first promotion to Yugoslav Second League. On their debut in Second League, FK Zeta won fourth place, but historical success come one season later (1999-2000). After hard struggle with Mladost Lučani, team from Golubovci won the title and gained promotion to First Yugoslav League.
Historical first game in the First League, Zeta played at 12 August 2000 against Milicionar (4:0) in Golubovci. That game at Trešnica stadium was attended by 5,000 supporters. FK Zeta spent six consecutive seasons in Yugoslav First League, often placed at the upper-half of championship table. With FK Zeta promotion to First League, new local rivalry was born – against Budućnost from neighbouring Podgorica.

Zeta made many successful results in the First League, and among them were often victories against two strongest sides – Partizan and Red Star. Except that, FK Zeta became the strongest Montenegrin team in First League at most of the seasons in period 2000–2006.

Highest final placement in top-division of Serbia and Montenegro, Zeta made on season 2004–05. They finished third and qualified for first performance in European competitions. On debut, Zeta was defeated at 2005–06 UEFA Cup second leg, against Bosnian side Široki Brijeg.

Additionally, at the same time, Zeta started producing notable young talent like Miloš Marić who transferred to Greek club Olympiacos in the summer of 2004, as well as brothers Bojan and Nenad Brnović, and Branimir Petrović who were all signed by Partizan, and more recently Milanko Rašković and Nikola Trajković who transferred to Red Star Belgrade.

Period 2006-
Following Montenegrin independence, FK Zeta became a member of Montenegrin First League and won historical, first champions title in independent state. Namely, on season 2006-07, after hard struggle with FK Budućnost, which lasted until the last week, Zeta finished at first place. Game between Budućnost and Zeta, played at 8 April 2007 in Podgorica, in front of 10,000 spectators, is recorded by record-high attendance on one First Montenegrin League match.
As a first champion of Montenegro, FK Zeta became the country's first representatives in the UEFA Champions League for 2007–08. After beating FBK Kaunas in the first qualifying round (3-1; 2–3), they lost against Rangers (0-1; 0–2) in the second qualifying round.
During the following years, FK Zeta was a runner-up on season 2007-08, and third-placed team after the season 2011-12.
Among numerous performances in European competitions, FK Zeta made greatest result on Europa League 2012-13. In the first round, Zeta eliminated Armenian side FC Pyunik (1-2; 3–0), with aggregate victory against Finlandian team JJK Jyväskylä (1-0; 2–3) in the second round. Opponent of FK Zeta in third round was FK Sarajevo from Bosnia and Herzegovina (1-0; 1–2). After that, FK Zeta played in Europa League play-off round, with elimination against PSV Eindhoven (0-5; 0–9).
Another significant success in domestic competitions, FK Zeta made on season 2016-17. After impressive performances, the team from Golubovci finished as a runner-up, with the same number of points as a title-winners from Budućnost, but with worst head-to-head score. With that result, FK zeta made another comeback to UEFA Europe League (2017–18), but they were eliminated at the first stage against Bosnian-Herzegovian side Željezničar (2-2; 0–1).
The club remained among the top-class sides in Montenegrin First League during the next years, so they made another two performances in UEFA Europa League – on season 2019–20 against Fehérvár FC (1-5; 0-0) and next year.

First League Record

For the first time, FK Zeta played in Yugoslav First League on season 2000–01. Below is a list of FK Zeta scores in First League by every single season.

Seasons with green background were played in the first league of Yugoslavia or Serbia and Montenegro, together with Serbian clubs.

FK Zeta in European competitions

For the first time, FK Zeta played in European competitions on season 2005–06. Until now, they played ten seasons in European cups, their most successful campaign being in 2012–13, when Zeta reached the play-off round of Europa League.

Honours and achievements
Montenegrin First League – 1
winners (1): 2006–07
runner-up (2): 2007–08, 2016–17
Second Yugoslav League – 1
winners (1):1999–00
 Montenegrin Republic League – 1
winners (1): 1997-98
 Montenegrin Republic Cup – 2
winners (2): 1998–99, 1999-00

Players

Current squad

Notable players
For the list of former and current players with Wikipedia article, please see :Category:FK Zeta players.
Below is the list of FK Zeta players which made international careers or played for national teams of their countries.

 Zoran Batrović
 Darko Šuškavčević
 Radoslav Batak
 Cadú
 Danilo Goiano
 Sávio
 Miloš Marić
 Nikola Trajković
 Petar Puača
 Ajazdin Nuhi
 Nenad Brnović
 Bojan Brnović
 Miodrag Vukotić
 Mladen Lambulić
 Branislav Vukomanović
  Malesija Vojvoda
 Mitar Peković
 Mladen Božović
 Vladimir Boljević
 Camilo Jimenez
 Rodolfo Burger

Historical list of coaches

 Vojo Gardašević (1980 - 1981)
 Rade Vešović (2000 - 2001)
 Nikola Rakojević (2001 - 2003)
 Dejan Vukićević (2003 - 2007)
 Slobodan Halilović (2007)
 Mladen Vukićević (30 Aug 2007 - Aug 2008)
 Dejan Roganović (1 Oct 2008 - Apr 2009)
 Milan Đuretić (6 May 2009 - Jun 2009)
 Velibor Matanović (Jul 2009 - Nov 2009)
 Dragoljub Đuretić (12 nov 2009 - Aug 2010)
 Dejan Vukićević (31 Aug 2010 - 2011)
 Rade Vešović (2011 - Oct 2012)
 Darko Šuškavčević (13 Oct 2012 - Apr 2013)
 Mladen Vukićević (22 Apr 2013 - Mar 2014)
 Rade Vešović (10 Mar 2014 - Sep 2014)
 Mladen Lambulić (18 Sep 2014 - Apr 2015)
 Dušan Vlaisavljević (15 Apr 2015 - Jun 2015)
 Miodrag Martać (Jul 2015 - Oct 2015)
 Nenad Brnović (3 Oct 2015 - Nov 2015)
 Dejan Vukićević (8 Nov 2015 - 2016)
 Dušan Vlaisavljević (12 Jan 2017 - Jun 2017)
 Dejan Roganović (Jul 2017 - Apr 2018)
 Dragoljub Đuretić (5 Apr 2018 - )
 Dušan Vlaisavljević (20 Jun 2018 - Jul 2018)
 Dragoljub Đuretić (2018 - 1 Feb 2019)
 Dejan Roganović (5 Feb 2019 - 1 Jan 2021)
 Dragoljub Đuretić (5 July 2021   – )

Stadium

FK Zeta home ground is Stadion Trešnjica, built during the 1996. Until now, stadium is renovated several times (last time 2016) and near the main ground is built another pitch with artificial turf.
FK Zeta is playing First League games at Trešnjica stadium from 2000. Biggest crowd on games was 5,000 in numerous occasions, especially during the matches against Budućnost and, earlier, against Partizan and Red Star Belgrade.

Sponsors
Official kit supplier: Kappa

See also
Golubovci
Zeta Plain
Podgorica
Montenegrin Second League
Montenegrin clubs in Yugoslav football competitions (1946–2006)

References

External links
 Official website
 Profile by Weltfussballarchiv 
 Fudbalski savez Crne Gore

 
Football clubs in Montenegro
Football clubs in Podgorica
Association football clubs established in 1927
1927 establishments in Montenegro